Kentucky Route 49 (KY 49) is a  state highway in the U.S. state of Kentucky.

Route description
KY 49 begins at an intersection with U.S. Route 150 (US 150) in Bardstown and travels south towards Loretto. It then heads east-southeast concurrent with KY 52 to Lebanon. It splits with KY 52 in Lebanon and goes southeast to Bradfordsville. After that, it terminates in Liberty, at an intersection with KY 70.

History

The road has seen improvements from Bradfordsville to Lebanon in recent years which has made the corridor safer and less curvy.

Major intersections

See also

References

0049
Transportation in Nelson County, Kentucky
Transportation in Marion County, Kentucky
Transportation in Casey County, Kentucky